Equalize Health (formerly D-Rev) is a not-for-profit medical technology company with offices in India, Kenya, and the United States.

Equalize Health’s products include the ReMotion Knee, a polycentric prosthetic knee for above-the-knee amputees, and Brilliance, a phototherapy device for treating neonatal jaundice. Equalize health products have been sold in 70+ countries including India, Nepal, Pakistan, Bangladesh, Sri Lanka, Uganda, Kenya, Tanzania, Malawi, Nigeria, Botswana, Senegal, South Africa, Colombia, Ecuador, Guatemala, Fiji, Indonesia, and Iraq.

Business model
Equalize Health (formerly D-Rev) is a 501(c)(3) organisation that researches, designs, and develops products and then works with in-country partners such as Phoenix Medical Systems and Puspadi Bali to deliver products.

Equalize health products are bought directly by people or organisation like health ministries, clinics, doctors, or hospitals. Philanthropic donations to equalize health facilitate product design, in-market user intelligence, supply chain and distribution planning, R&D, product marketing, and operations costs.

Products

Brilliance
 
Brilliance is a phototherapy device that treats neonatal jaundice, or hyperbilirubinemia, a medical condition that affects 60% of newborns worldwide, 16.5% of whom suffer from severe  that can lead to brain damage, nervous system damage (kernicterus), and death. Jaundice can be treated through phototherapy, which breaks down the excess bilirubin in a jaundiced newborn’s blood.
 
Brilliance uses high-intensity blue light-emitting diode (LED) lights rather than the fluorescent tube lights used in traditional phototherapy devices. Brilliance LEDs last for ten years without needing replacement, while compact fluorescent light bulbs need to be replaced every four to six months. Brilliance is meant to help hospitals by getting rid of the need to replace bulbs, saving them money on compact fluorescent tube lights, and getting rid of treatment gaps caused by a lack of bulbs. Tests at the Stanford School of Medicine show that Brilliance performs on par with or better than traditional Western phototherapy devices. Brilliance is priced to sell for $400 (22,000 INR).

ReMotion Knee

The ReMotion Knee, previously the JaipurKnee, is a prosthetic knee joint for above-knee amputees. The Jaipur Knee was developed by students at Stanford University in 2009. The student project worked with the Jaipur Foot Organization ,or Bhagwan Mahaveer Viklang Sahayata Samiti, Jaipur (BMVSS) ,to develop a low-cost knee joint to be used at BMVSS clinics in India and temporary fitting camps around the world. 
  
A group of Stanford University students started ReMotion, an independent company to pursue the design and distribution of the prosthetic knee joint. Equalize Health acquired ReMotion and all of its IP in 2012. Amputees were first fit with the ReMotion Knee in May 2013. The ReMotion Knee weighs 0.88 lb/ (400 g)and is produced using injection molding, allowing for centralized manufacturing and a slimmer device profile. The ReMotion Knee has a projected retail price of $80 USD.

Impact
Equalize Health released its impact dashboards in June 2014. Reflecting a strong industry emphasis on measuring impact of social entrepreneurship, D-Rev designed and implemented impact measurement tools and tracking for each device.

Brilliance
As of June 30, 2020, Equalize Health reports that more than 900,000 babies have been treated with Brilliance devices.
 
ReMotion Knee
As of June 30, 2020, 777 amputees have been fit with the ReMotion Knee.

History
D-Rev was founded in 2007 by Paul Polak and engineer Kurt Kulmann with the mission to “benefit the 90% of the people on earth who are poor, in order to help them earn their way out of poverty”. In 2009, Krista Donaldson joined D-Rev as CEO.

Donaldson spoke at TEDWomen 2014, TEDx Stanford 2012, and the Clinton Global Initiative. Prior to D-Rev, Donaldson interned at the design firm IDEO, worked as a staff engineer for KickStart International on micro-irrigation pumps, and served as an Iraq Economic Officer for the U.S. Department of State. Donaldson has been or currently serves as a lecturer at the University of Cape Town, Kenyatta University, and Stanford University.
In November 2020, D-Rev changed its name to Equalize Health to better reflect its mission of creating medical technology for everyone.

Recognition
In 2013, D-Rev was included in Fast Company’s World’s Most Innovative Companies 2013 list. Krista Donaldson was named one of Fast Company’s Co. Design 50 – designers shaping the future of design in 2012. Brilliance was recognized by the Tech Museum of Innovation in its 2013 Tech Awards. D-Rev was a 2013 Nokia Health Laureate.
 
D-Rev’s ReMotion Knee was recognized with a Siemens Stiftung "Empowering People" award.
 
In 2014, Krista Donaldson represented D-Rev as a Technology Pioneer at the 2014 World Economic Forum in Davos, Switzerland.

References

Charities based in California
Non-profit organizations based in San Francisco
Health charities in the United States
Medical device manufacturers
Medical and health organizations based in California